The Men's 10 m synchro platform competition of the 2020 European Aquatics Championships was held on 15 May 2021.

Results
The final was started at 17:00.

References

Men's 10 m synchro platform